Monkey Hips and Rice: The "5" Royales Anthology is a compilation album by the American R&B group the "5" Royales, released in 1994. It collects songs from the group's King and Apollo years. The only two-disc title in Rhino Records' King Master Series, it was released the same year that group members Eugene Tanner and Obadiah Carter died.

Robert Palmer, while working on the 1995 WGBH/BBC Rock & Roll television series, listed the compilation as one of ten essential documents of "Classic Rock & Roll".

Production
The compilation was produced by Gary Stewart and James Austin. The album liner notes were penned by Ed Ward. Monkey Hips and Rice includes a track from the Royal Suns Quintet, an earlier lineup of the group.

Critical reception

Robert Christgau wrote that "Lowman Pauling's hard-touring sextet did it all, laughs included, and although Pauling's thought-through songwriting and groundbreaking guitar made him the auteur, singer Johnny Tanner deserves more grafs than he'll ever get in the prehistory of soul." The Los Angeles Times thought that "there is some less-than immortal novelty fare among the album's 41 songs—such as the forced double-entendre 'Laundromat Blues'—but most are real gems." The Washington Post noted that Pauling "pioneered the use of single-note, distorted guitar fills and helped fuse gospel and blues into soul."

AllMusic called the collection "impeccable," writing that the group "take off toward the end of the first disc, stretching through the second disc, with a stretch of invigorating music that is among the greatest R&B ever recorded." (The New) Rolling Stone Album Guide deemed the compilation's selections "brilliantly chosen," and lamented that it was out of print. Peter Guralnick labeled it "a stone classic."

Track listing

References

1994 compilation albums
Rhino Records albums